The Kerala Cricket Association (KCA) is the governing body of the game of cricket in the Kerala state of the Republic of India. It is affiliated to the Board of Control for Cricket in India and governs the Kerala cricket team.

KCA is also the parent body of 14 district associations – one in each of the revenue districts of Kerala, responsible for governing the game of cricket in their respective districts.

KCA implements its programs through its units – the district associations. It conducts zone level as well as state-level age-group tournaments for Under-14, Under-16, Under-19, Under-22, and Under-25. State teams of these categories are selected through these tournaments. KCA participates in all age group tournaments conducted by the BCCI in both men's and women's categories. It also hosts national tournaments and international matches in the state. Through its program CASH-Kerala, KCA adopts and trains around 500 school children every year through its district level and state level cricket academies. Operation Gold Hunt is another program of KCA where it adopts and trains selected young athletes, to help them achieve higher goals.

History
G. V. Raja, Consort Prince of Travancore, formed the Travancore-Cochin Cricket Association in 1950. The primary objective of the association was to popularise the game in the State of Travancore-Cochin. The formative meeting of the Travancore-Cochin Cricket Association was held in the auditorium of the Maharaja's College, Eranakulam, due to the efforts of the P. M. Krishnan and P. M. Raghavan with support from Raja. Upon its inception, the Travancore-Cochin Cricket Association selected the Travancore-Cochin first class team, which was led by P. M. Raghavan. The team played its first match in the Ranji Trophy circuit against Mysore, where the P. M. Anandan took six-wickets, conceding 100 runs in 27 overs in the first innings of the match. Following the formation of the state of Kerala in 1956, the Travancore-Cochin Cricket Association was renamed as the Kerala Cricket Association (KCA).

There were certain intrinsic difficulties that hindered the progress of Kerala cricket. Since the South-Western monsoon rains hit the Kerala Coast as early as the first week of June every year, the Cricketing season could only start in October as opposed to June–July in other parts of the Country. Being a small strip of land between the Western Ghats and the Arabian Sea, availability of land is a big challenge in the State; hence the sporting infrastructure is generally shared by multiple sports disciplines. This was a major hindrance in developing permanent turf pitches and decent outfields. The extent of the problem was so much so that till very recently the only exclusive Cricket ground in Kerala was owned by the Thripunithura Cricket Club; which is physically located in a manner which presented little or no scope for further development; in spite of the relentless efforts by the successive Club authorities. The absence of finance was a further handicap. Since there were no Stadia with the required facilities available in the State until the very recent past, the scope of hosting international matches was nonexistent. This hindered the association's efforts of raising funds. Participation of the State teams in the national tournaments like Ranji trophy usually poised a big struggle to the administrators. These predicaments were overcome only with the sheer willpower of the then administrators and to a great extent with the generous and timely financial assistance provided by philanthropists like S. V. Pandit. Gradually, however, things made a turn for the better, and through the sixties, the State participated in the various inter-school and age group tournaments run by the BCCI. The mid-nineties had been a period of eminence for Cricket in Kerala when its Ranji Trophy side qualified to the knockout stages of the tournament for the first time in the 1994/95 season. The team continued its fete in the next season as well when they qualified to the super league staged of the tournament. Players like Ananthapadmanabhan, Sunil Oasis, Feroze V Rasheed, M Suresh, Ajay Kuduva, Sreekumar Nair, Ramprakash and Sujith Somasunder had contributed profoundly to this achievement.
 
The last two decades had witnessed a paradigm shift in Kerala Cricket in both ways; performing as a team and as individuals. Beginning with pacer Tinu Yohanan's inclusion in the National side, the tempo was sustained by the inclusion of S Sreesanth later on. The present-day Kerala Cricket teams are making deep inroads in almost all BCCI tournaments as the State is slowly emerging as one of the powerhouses of Indian Cricket. This can be corroborated with the fact that as many as 7 players from the State are playing in the Indian Premier League representing different teams; of whom the teenage sensation Sanju Samson has become an icon of the emerging face of Kerala Cricket after his prolific performances in the League for the Rajasthan Royals. Sanju was chosen as the best young player in the League.

Affiliation
The Kerala Cricket Association (KCA) is one of the constituent members of the BCCI and it has fielded its team in the Ranji Trophy – India's first-class tournament, ever since the formation of the association. A lot of eminent cricket personalities from the KCA have served the game at the national level and among them, the legendary Lt. Col. Goda Varma Raja, is definitely the foremost. He was the president of Kerala Cricket association from the years 1950 to 1963 and he was also the first person from Kerala to become an office bearer in BCCI when he became its vice-president. Apart from Lt. Col. Raja, Mr. S Karunakaran Nair popularly known as SK Nair, from Kerala Cricket Association served the BCCI as the treasurer during 1993–97, as finance committee chairman during 1998–2002, and as the honorary secretary of BCCI from 2003 to 2005. He had also served the Asian Cricket Council as its treasurer and secretary. The late SV Pandit, who was the president of Travancore Cricket association till his death, had helped the Kerala Cricket Association a lot by way of financial assistance.

Logo
KCA has adopted a logo similar to that of the BCCI. The basic element of the logo resembles the insignia of the Order of the Star of India. Instead of the star in the crest, a stylized image of Imperial Insignia of Sree Padmanabha's Shankha, which was the state emblem of the Kingdom of Travancore as well as the state emblem of the State of Kerala, is used.

Eminent personalities
Lt. Col. Goda Varma Raja

The man who marched Kerala Cricket forward was legendary Lt. Col. Goda Varma Raja of the Travancore royal family. A Prince among sportsmen and a sportsman among princes, Lt. Col. Raja was responsible for putting Kerala in the sports and Tourist maps of India. A Keen Sportsman himself he played all the games, though he had a weakness for Tennis and polo. It was his great vision that led to the development of Kovalam as one of the finest beaches in the world and the commissioning of the Trivandrum Airport. He was President of Kerala Cricket Association for 13 years from 1950 to 1963 and was the first person from Kerala to become an office-bearer of the BCCI; when he became its vice-president. He was in line to become its president but for the tragic air crash which killed him. Lt. Col. Raja still lives in the memory of all Sports lovers in the State. The G. V. Raja Pavilion in the University Stadium as well as the first and the premier sports school in Kerala are named after him. The Kerala Cricket Association has announced the launch of a National Level Tournament to sustain his memories.

S Karunakaran Nair (SK Nair)

SK Nair was the face of Kerala cricket for many years. He was the first from the sState to become a principal office bearer of the BCCI when he served it as its honorary treasurer from 1993 to 1997; during which period he also served as the honorary treasurer of the Kerala State Sports Council. Later he went on to serve the board as its honorary secretary from 2003 to 2005. He was the chairman of the board's finance committee from 1998 to 2002 and had also served the Asian Cricket Council as its treasurer and secretary. As a medium pacer and middle-order batsman, he had skippered the Kerala Under-25 cricket team for six years. He became the president of the Kerala Cricket Association in 2005 and went on serving it till 2007. He was a banker by profession; employed by the State Bank of Travancore from where he took voluntary retirement as a sports officer.

Famous players
By far Kerala had been able to produce only three international cricketers. However, the State had produced some very stylish players who at their times were considered as definite national prospects. While so many of them were noticed by National Selectors, many a time more prolific careers in the same speciality had proved to be a hindrance for the furtherance of their careers to the next level. One classic example is that of KN Ananthapadmanabhan; whose career was coincided with that of the legendary Anil Kumble.

Balan Pandit
Balan Pandit was the first star of Kerala Cricket. He was very well known in the Indian Domestic Circuit. Born in Koonammavu in Ernakulam district on 16 June 1926, Pandit had spent many years away from Kerala and had attended the prestigious King George School in Mumbai. He used to work for BEST when Lt. Col. G.V. Raja, the founder president of the Kerala Cricket Association took initiative to bring him back to Kerala. Such was his class; that it is widely believed that if Pandit had chosen to stay in Mumbai, he would have definitely played for India. A wicketkeeper-batsman, Pandit had begun his first-class career representing Kathiawar in 1946. He was the wicketkeeper for Kathiawar in the match against Maharashtra in 1948, where Bhausaheb Nimbalkar scored an unbeaten 443 runs; the highest first-class score by an Indian batsman. In a Ranji Trophy match in 1959 against Andhra; his 14th for Kerala, Pandit scored an unbeaten 262, which was the highest individual score for Kerala before Sreekumar Nair hit a triple century against Services in 2007. As a wicketkeeper, he has 35 catches and 3 stumpings in his kitty. Pandit also served as an administrator when he served KCA as its vice-president and as the Chairman of Selectors. He was also a member of India's junior selection committee. The most significant contribution of Pandit to Kerala Cricket is that it was him who had introduced the game's modern techniques and professionalism to a bunch of amateur cricketers; who at that time was merely following the sport as a recreational means.

K N Ananthapadmanabhan
No chronicle of the modern-day Kerala Cricket would be complete without the name of KN Ananthapadmanabhan. He was a star in his own right. A crafty leg-spinner and a resourceful middle-order batsman, Ananthan; as he is known commonly, was widely considered as a definite Indian team probable in his playing days. But unfortunately for him, his career coincided with that of Anil Kumble's, and his appearances in the big stage were restricted to few matches against visiting overseas teams. However, he was the first player from Kerala to be selected to the India 'A' squad. During the early nineties when Kerala was usually considered as a punching bag of the South Zone bigwigs Karnataka, Tamil Nadu and Hyderabad, Ananthan's top-class bowling performances were the only silver linings for Kerala. He was the one who instilled self-belief among the State's Cricketers and Kerala started winning matches by banking on his bowling capabilities. He along with M Suresh Kumar (Umbri), B Ramprakash, Sunil Oasis, and Feroz V Rasheed propelled the Kerala bowling line-up of the later nineties into a formidable one. Worth mentioning is that all of them were very competent batsmen too. He has played in 105 first-class matches, has taken 344 wickets and has scored 2891 runs including three centuries of which one was a double century. Fittingly he was the captain when Kerala qualified to the knock out stages of the Ranji Trophy Tournament for the first time in its history in 1994–95. Ananthan still continues to serve the game as Level-II coach and a Level-II Umpire. He has officiated matches in the Domestic Tournaments including the Ranji Trophy as well as in the IPL. He has also served as a Member BCCI Junior selection committee in 2006/07. His brother KN Balasubramanium has also played for the State in a few matches.

Tinu Yohannan

Tinu Yohannan became the first Player from Kerala to be selected to the National side, when he was picked up for India's home series against England in 2001. He made his debut at Mohali, where the first Test match of the series was played. His career got off the ground fabulously when he claimed his first scalp in the fourth ball of his very first over and later went on to claim the next opener as well. However, his form went on to a plunge, and eventually, he ended up playing only in three tests and as many numbers of ODIs. Tinu was trained by none other than the great Richard Hadlee at the MRF Pace Foundation and soon after he was selected to the first batch of trainees in the National Cricket Academy along with Yuvraj Singh, Gautham Gambhir, Zaheer Khan, Harbhajan Singh, Mohammed Kaif, Shiv Sunder Das, Lakshmi Ratan Shukla, Murali Karthik, Reetinder Singh Sodhi, Ramesh Powar, Sridharan Sriram and Ajay Ratra among others. He played for Royal Challengers Bangalore in the 2009 edition of the Indian Premier League. His father, T. C. Yohannan was a Long Jumper who held the national record for nearly 3 decades and had represented India in the 1976 Summer Olympics in Montreal, Canada. Tinu's inclusion in the National side had created a newfound enthusiasm amongst the Kerala players which is sustained ever since. Till then it was widely believed that no one from Kerala could ever play on the National side since the State's team was very weakly placed in the Ranji Trophy table, but Tinu's inclusion had uprooted that belief as players started believing in themselves. Currently, Kerala is widely recognized as a nursery of fast bowlers in India.

S Sreesanth

The first one to follow Tinu's footsteps was S Sreesanth. He had started as a leg spinner initially; however due to his good height of 6 feet 3 inches before long he had turned his attention towards fast bowling after being encouraged by his elder brother. He made his first-class and debut in Kerala's Ranji Trophy match against Goa in the 2002–03 domestic season, claiming 22 wickets in seven matches a performance which helped him to get selected to the South Zone side in the Duleep Trophy squad in the same season. He was selected to the India-A side in a tour match against the visiting New Zealand side in Rajkot, where he took just one wicket in twelve overs after being constrained by a hamstring injury. In November 2004, Sreesanth entered the record books when he took a hat-trick against Himachal Pradesh in a Ranji trophy game. He was selected to play for India B in the Challenger Trophy in October 2005, where he performed impressively and eventually winning the Man of the Series award. This had led to his selection in the National side for the home ODI series against Sri Lanka.

Sreesanth's name is perhaps the most bountiful in Kerala's and perhaps even in the National Sports Circuit for both good and bad reasons. While most of the sports personalities are remembered for their performances and achievements in their respective sports disciplines, Sreesanth is mostly known for his exploits both inside and outside the playing arena. Sreesanth's emotional antics have led him to be regarded by some observers as eccentric. He had been penalized on a number of occasions for breaching the International Cricket Council's as well as the BCCI's Code of Conduct. The Kerala Cricket Association had issued him with a stern warning in the past after he went to inaugurate a college dance competition instead of reporting to the Ranji Trophy Preparatory Camp. The tide of public sentiments was immensely antagonistic on him initially following the Delhi Police booked him for his alleged involvement in the IPL spot-fixing. However, some later developments and certain observations made by the courts had caused the animosities to recede and in place of the loathing, the public became more compassionate towards him; at least in the State. Support groups were formed to declare their trust and support to him and his family when he was jailed briefly during the period. Though he had never been a regular constituent in the National Side, he had been part of some of the most famous Indian victories; notably in the finals of both the World Cups which India had won recently – the ICC World Cup 2011 and the ICC T20 World Cup 2007.

Sanju V Samson

Kerala had traditionally had produced some very fine bowlers. But except a very few from the past like Balan Pandit, no batsmen had really made their presence felt in the national scene till very recently. Sanju is essentially one of the finest batsmen Kerala has ever produced and is a fine wicket-keeper too; though he is better known for his batting skills. He had announced his arrival at a very early age of 12 by scoring 900 runs including 4 centuries in 5 matches of the South Zone U-13 tournament hosted by the Karnataka State Cricket Association. Later, he had led the U-16 and U-19 sides of the State with distinction, where his performances with both the bat and glove had helped Kerala to secure a place in the Elite league of the Cooch Behar Trophy. He made his first-class debut in 2011 at the age of 16. He was included in the Indian U-19 squad for the Asia cup; where his performance was poor. 2013 had been particularly good for Sanju as he had scored 2 first-class centuries and was drafted to the IPL team Rajasthan Royals under the stewardship of the great wall Rahul Dravid. Sanju had performed well with both the bat and gloves in the tournament and had won the best young player of the League. Sanju was chosen as the vice-captain of the Indian U-19 side touring Australia. In 2013 he was picked into the India A side who played the touring New Zealand A team. In 2014, he was made the Vice-captain of the U-19 Indian team for the Asia Cup side which was played in UAE. Later on, in the same year, he was picked up to the India A side which toured in Australia for participating in a quadrangular tournament. Sanju could prove his worth in the triangular series where he emerged as the top run-getter for the team even while batting in the 7th place. His performance was crucial for the team in winning the title and this led to his inclusion in the Senior India squad for the ODI series in England; making him only the third player from the State to achieve fate.

Famous officials
Jose Kurishinkal

Jose Kurishinkal was the first First-class as well as international umpire from Kerala. An engineer by profession, Jose was a good leg-spinner during his playing days. He has officiated in 3 ODIs as on-field umpire and in 1 as the TV umpire. Apart from these, he had officiated in 19 First-class matches, 10 List-A matches, and numerous junior matches. He was widely regarded as a good umpire and it was widely believed in the circuit that he would be appointed to officiate in Test matches; if not he had not chosen to retire earlier for pursuing his engineering career oversees. Jose was instrumental in mentoring budding Umpires and even today he gets involved in umpire training. He had also served as the secretary of the Trivandrum District Cricket Association. Following Jose's footsteps, two more Umpires from Kerala; Dandapani Sankaralingam and Dr. K. N. Raghavan, had officiated in international matches.

MISSION – 2020
KCA had published its revised vision document – MISSION-2020 in 2007. The document replaced an earlier vision document which was released in 2005 called Vsion-2010.
Mission statement:
MISSION – 2020– is a master plan that is guaranteed to change the profile of the game in the state, by the year 2020. It envisages the following:-
 To develop multiple venues for first-class cricket in all the fourteen districts of Kerala.
 To have Cricket Academies in all Districts
 To produce at least one cricketer at the National level, who would represent the Country in the next five years.
 To graduate from plate group in Ranji Trophy to elite group, within the next five years.
 To ensure continuous development of Players, Coaches, Umpires, Video analysts and Physiotherapists and Trainers to improve the quality of the game in the state.
 To develop a program of cricket@school to ensure the healthy development of cricket at the school level, by tapping the potential of the physical education teachers of schools, through seminars conducted in each district.
 To conduct a super league with the inclusion of winners and runners up from weaker districts.
 To conduct inter-district and intradistrict school tournaments.
 To conduct an All India invitation cricket tournament in the state.
 To conduct a state-level tournament along with district-level tournaments.
 To have rural coaching centers in all districts, where coaches would be employed to oversee the district and rural coaching facilities.
 To develop a cricket culture in the state which would go a long way to complement the other programs of MISSION-2020
 Celebrating excellence
 To conduct State championship
 To Conduct Kerala Premier League

CASH-Kerala, Cricket@School and Talent Hunt
CASH-Kerala (Cricket Academies and Sports Hostels) and Cricket@School are two very impressive programs launched by KCA to promulgate the official cricketing circuit among the young children of the state. It is one of the most ambitious projects undertaken by any of the state associations in the BCCI, so much so that almost 50% of KCA's income is spent on identifying and nurturing Cricketing talents at a very early age. These programs have created a new momentum in Kerala's junior cricket scenario.

CASH-Kerala
CASH-Kerala was launched in 2009. Under this umbrella, KCA runs 1 State Academy for College Boys, 5 State Level Academies for Higher Secondary Boys, 1 State Level Academy for Higher Secondary Girls, 1 State Level Academy for School Boys, 2 State Level Academies for School Girls and 15 District Academies. Altogether these academies have adopted more than 400 boys and girls. Every Academy is residential and employs a full-time Coach and a warden. KCA bears the cost of Boarding, Cricket clothing, and equipment, Food, and Conveyance of the trainees and the staff members. Every year, the selection process for admission to the academies is done painstakingly done. From a very large number of hopefuls who turns up at the selection trials, only the best and most talented of them make the cut. They are put through the grind by a panel of experienced coaches and veteran players and the final batch is selected to undergo training at CASH–Kerala academies, an acronym for Cricket Academies and Sports Hostels.

Talent Hunt
Talent Hunt is another ambitious program launched by the KCA to expand the talent base of the game in the State. This runs in parallel with the academies and aims at bringing students who wish to continue as day scholars rather than joining the residential academies. Qualified coaches impart regular training at select centers which are overseen Centrally.

Centre of Excellence

The KCA Centre of excellence is envisaged as an extension of the Talent Hunt project; where specialist academies are run for individual skill sets of the game. The camps are designed to enhance the skill levels of the trainees in their chosen area and aimed at the overall development of the player. The program also looks at improving the knowledge base of the coaches.

Cricket@School
KCA has constructed practice facilities and has appointed part-time Coaches in more than 500 schools across the state as part of the Cricket@School program. One of the most conspicuous features of the program is the yearly seminars organized for the Physical Education Teachers in every District. Interested Teachers are also trained in rendering Cricket Coaching to their wards in the respective schools. On top of this, an annual Inter-School Tournament is organized by the KCA. The Tournament is conducted in four different Levels; Education District Level, Revenue District Level, Zone Level, and finally in the State Level. Winners and Runner ups of the lower levels qualify to play in the higher levels. The tournament engages the participation of about 1000 Schools; where about 15,000 children play at least one game in the official circuit every year. The event is probably one of the largest Periodic Cricketing Events in the world. Apart from this, KCA has started to distribute free softball equipment to schools to attract more girl children to the game. Summer coaching camps previously organized by the District Associations are now organized and monitored centrally by KCA to bring in common standards of Coaching across the State.

Playing grounds
International Stadium
Greenfield International Stadium, Thiruvananthapuram, University Stadium (Thiruvananthapuram), and the Jawaharlal Nehru International Stadium, Kochi have hosted international matches. However, these grounds are not owned by KCA nor they are exclusive Cricket Grounds. This has created numerous headaches while hosting National and International matches. As part of its efforts to own its own exclusive ground, In 2009, KCA entered into a long-term lease with the Greater Cochin Development Authority (GCDA) to operate the Jawaharlal Nehru International Stadium (JNIS).KCA signed an MOU with KSFL to maintain and utilize the stadium for a stipulated period.

First Class Grounds
Endeavor to build exclusive First Class Cricket grounds in all districts is one of the major initiatives undertaken by the KCA. Under this earnest initiative, the association has made 9 grounds operational across the State and has purchased land to construct grounds in four districts. KCA plans to commission at least two grounds every year till the goal is reached. These grounds are developed in either own land or in lands belonging to clubs or educational institutions on long-term understanding. With this, the association intends to put an end to the dearth of turf wickets and decent outfields in the State. A dedicated civil engineering wing under a project coordinator oversees these activities.

KCA OWNED STADIUMS
KRISHNAGIRI STADIUM-  WAYANAD,
KCA CRICKET STADIUM - MANAGALAPURAM
KCA CRICKET STADIUM - THODUPUZHA
KCA CRICKET STADIUM - KASARGODE

STADIUMS WITH MOUGREEN FIELD STADIUM - TRIVANDRUM 
ST XAVIERS COLLEGE-KCA CRICKET GROUND-THUMBA-TRIVANDRUM
RAJAGIRI STADIUM-ERNAKULAM
ST PAULS COLLEGE GROUND - ERNAKULAM
KCA CRICKET STADIUM - PERINTHALMANNA - MALAPPURAM
THALSSERY CRICKET STADIUM - THALSSERY

Upcoming Cricket Field

 KCA Cricket Stadium - Ezhukone - Kollam
 Alampady Cricket Stadium, Alampady, Kasaragod

Office bearers
Mr. B Vinodkmar is the new president of the association and its representative to the BCCI, Mr. Jayesh George is the secretary and Adv. Sreejith V Nair is the treasurer.

Controversies

The Greenfield International Stadium was announced as the venue for the India West Indies cricket match to be conducted on 1 November 2018 during West Indies tour of India. The Board of Control for Cricket in India (BCCI)'s tour and programme committee which met in Mumbai has allotted five one-day international matches between India and West Indies in Mumbai, Indore, Guwahati, Pune and Thiruvananthapuram. But Kerala Cricket Association (KCA) has decided to choose Kochi over Thiruvananthapuram.

The Kerala Cricket Association's insistence on having the match at Jawaharlal Nehru International Stadium in Kochi ignited a furor after the football-loving community lodged their strong protest against the move which even saw online campaign #SaveKochiTurf.

They felt that KCA's decision to reconstruct pitches at the JNI stadium will damage the turf laid for the U-17 World Cup last year. They also felt that staging the ODI in November would jeopardize the home fixtures of Kerala Blasters and playing on a revamped surface would put players to the risk of injuries. Sports personalities, including Sachin Tendulkar, Sourav Ganguly, IM Vijayan, Sunil Chhetri, CK Vineeth, Ian Hume, came out against KCA move and the Sports Minister of the state held a meeting with KCA officials.

Finally, Kerala Cricket Association (KCA) climbed down from its adamant stand of hosting India vs West Indies ODI in Kochi and agreed to have the match in Thiruvananthapuram.

References

External links
 Official website of the Kerala Cricket Association

Cricket administration in India
Cricket in Kerala
Sports organizations established in 1950
1950 establishments in India
Organisations based in Thiruvananthapuram